Nancy Long Creek is a stream in Douglas County, Georgia, United States.

References

Rivers of Georgia (U.S. state)
Rivers of Douglas County, Georgia